Chromolaena integrifolia  is a Caribbean species of flowering shrub in the family Asteraceae. It is found on the Islands of Dominica, Guadeloupe, La Desirade, Les Saintes, Marie Galante, Montserrat, and St. Kitts in the Lesser Antilles.

References

integrifolia
Flora of the Leeward Islands
Plants described in 1826
Flora without expected TNC conservation status